Shravanabelagola is a town located near Channarayapatna of Hassan district in the Indian state of Karnataka and is  from Bengaluru. The Gommateshwara Bahubali statue at Shravanabelagola is one of the most important tirthas (pilgrimage destinations) in Jainism, one that reached a peak in architectural and sculptural activity under the patronage of Western Ganga dynasty of Talakad. Chandragupta Maurya is said to have died here in 298 BCE after he became a Jain monk and assumed an ascetic life style.

Gommateshwara statue, Akkana Basadi, Chandragupta basadi, Chamundaraya Basadi, Parshvanath Basadi and inscriptions of Shravanabelagola group of monuments are listed as Adarsh Smarak Monument by  Archaeological Survey of India.

Location

Sacred places are spread over two hills, Chandragiri and Vindyagiri, and also among the villages at the foothills.

Etymology

Shravanabelagola "White Pond of the Shravana" is named with reference to the colossal image of Gommaṭa - the prefix Śravaṇa serves to distinguish it from other Belagolas with the prefixes Hale- and Kodi-, while Beḷagoḷa "white pond" is an allusion to the pond in the middle of the town. The Sanskrit equivalents Śvetasarovara, Dhavalasarovara and Dhavalasarasa used in the inscriptions that support this meaning. There are more than 560 inscriptions in Shravabelagola.

Some inscriptions mention the name of the place as Beḷgoḷa, which has given rise to another derivation from the plant Solanum ferox (hairy-fruited eggplant). This derivation is in allusion to a tradition which says that a pious old woman completely anointed the colossal image with the milk brought by her in a gullakayi or eggplant. The place is also designated as Devara Beḷgoḷa "White Pond of the God" and Gommaṭapuram "city of Gommaṭa" in some epigraphs.

History

Shravanabelagola has two hills, Chandragiri and Vindhyagiri. Acharya Bhadrabahu and his pupil Chandragupta Maurya are believed to have meditated there. Chandragupta Basadi, which was dedicated to Chandragupta Maurya, was originally built there by Ashoka in the third century BC. Chandragiri also has memorials to numerous monks and Śrāvakas who have meditated there since the fifth century AD, including the last king of the Rashtrakuta dynasty of Manyakheta. Chandragiri also has a famous temple built by Chavundaraya.

The 58-feet tall monolithic statue of Gommateshwara is located on Vindyagiri Hill. It is considered to be the world's largest monolithic statue. The base of the statue has an inscriptions in Prakrit, dating from 981 AD. The inscription praises the king who funded the effort and his general, Chavundaraya, who erected the statue for his mother. Every twelve years, thousands of devotees congregate here to perform the Mahamastakabhisheka, a spectacular ceremony in which the statue is anointed  with Water, Turmeric, Rice flour, Sugar cane juice, Sandalwood paste, saffron, and gold and silver flowers. Recently Mahamastakabhisheka was held in 2018 during feb month. The next Mahamastakabhisheka will be held in 2030.

Shravanabelagola, nestled by the Vindhyagiri and Chandragiri Hills, protected by the monolith Bhagwan Bahubali, and home to over 2,300 years of Jain heritage, is a veritable picture postcard of our history and heritage spanning the centuries. In the town of Shravanabelagola, stands a colossal rock-cut statue of Lord Gommateshwara Shri Bahubali. About eight hundred odd inscriptions which the Karnataka Archeological Department has collected at the place are mostly Jaina and cover a very extended period from 600 to 1830 A.D. Some refer even to the remote time of Chandragupta Maurya and also relate the story of the first settlement of Jains at Shravanabelagola. That this village was an acknowledged seat of learning is proved from the fact that a priest from here named Akalanka was in 788 A.D. summoned to the court of Himasitala at Kanchi where having confuted the Buddhists in public disputation, he was instrumental in gaining their expulsion from the South of India to Ceylon.

Inscriptions

More than 800 inscriptions have been found at Shravanabelagola, dating to various times from 600 AD to 1830 AD. A large number of these are found in the Chandragiri and the rest can be seen in the Vindhyagiri Hill and the town. Most of the inscriptions at the Chandragiri date back before the 10th century. These inscriptions include texts in the Kannada. The second volume of Epigraphia Carnatica, written by B. Lewis Rice, is dedicated to the inscriptions found here. It is said to be the oldest Konkani inscription. The inscriptions are written in Purvahalagannada (Ancient Kannada) and Halegannada (Old Kannada) characters. Some of these inscriptions mention the rise and growth in power of the Western Ganga Dynasty, the Rashtrakutas, the Hoysala Empire, the Vijayanagara Empire and the Udaiyaar dynasty. These inscriptions have helped modern scholars to understand the nature and development of the Kannada language and its literature.

The pillar dates to around 983 CE and exists on the Vindyagiri hill (called Dodda Betta in local Kannada language. On the base of the pillar, on the north side, is an inscription in old Kannada language of the same period.

Basadi

 Vindhyagiri hill
 Odegal basadi is the largest basadi on Vindhyagiri hill. The temple derives the name from 'Odega', i.e., soapstone used for strengthening the walls of the temple. The temple houses image of Rishabhanatha, Neminatha and Shantinatha.

 Chandragiri hill
 Chandragupta basadi was established in the 9th century. The middle cell of this temple has the figure of Parshvanatha, the one to the right the figure of Padmavathi and the one to the left the figure of Kushmandini, all in a seated posture.
 Chamundaraya Basadi is one of the largest temples on the hill. It is also known as Chavundaraya Basadi. It is dedicated to Neminatha, the 22nd Tirthankara. The sukhanasi consists of good figures of Sarvahna and Kushmandini, the yaksha and yakshi of Neminatha. It is dated back to 982 A.D. 
 Parshvanath Basadi is one of the two tallest temple tallest structure in Shravanabelagola. the temple houses a  monolithic colossal of Parshvanatha. The temple dates back to 12th century.
 Kattale Basadi is the largest temple on the hill. The temple features a garbhagriha, pradakshinapatha, sukanasa and a navranga joined by 16 pillars. the temple's front is joined with Chandragupta basadi. The temple houses an idol of Rishabhanatha flanked by chauri bearers.

The Sasana Basadi, Savitagandharva Basadi, Terina Basadi and Santiswara Basadi are other important temples on the Chandragiri hill.

 In town
 Akkana Basadi was built in 1181 A.D. Akkana Basadi has 23rd Tirthankara Parshwanath as main deity of the temple.
 Bhandari basadi is the largest temple in Shravanabelagola and enshrines idols of 24 tirthankar in arranged in a single row. The temple was constructed by Hula Raja, a general and bhandari during the reign of King Narasimha I of Hoysala Empire in 1159 CE.

Mahamastakabhisheka 

The Mahamastakabhisheka (Grand Consecration/The Great Indian Festival), refers to the abhiṣheka (anointment) of the Jain images when held on a large scale. The most famous of such consecrations is the anointment of the Bahubali Gommateshwara Statue located at Shravanabelagola. It is an important Jain festival held once in every 12 years. It is an integral part of the ancient and composite Jain tradition. The anointing last took place in February 2018, and the next ceremony is going to take place in 2030. During this festival, the statue is then bathed and anointed with libations such as milk, sugarcane juice, and saffron paste, and sprinkled with powders of sandalwood, turmeric, and vermilion.

The event has been attended by multiple political personalities including Krishna-Rajendra Wodeyar in 1910, Jawaharlal Nehru in 1951, Indira Gandhi in 1967 and 1981, A. P. J. Abdul Kalam in 2006, and Narendra Modi and Ramnath Kovind in 2018.

Other notable things

Shravanabelagola is the seat of the ancient Bhattaraka Matha, belonging to the Desiya Gana lineage of Mula Sangh, from the Digambara monastic tradition. Bahubali College of Engineering is an educational institute at Shravaṇabeḷagoḷa.

Shravanabelagola is also part of the route followed by the luxury tourist train, the Golden Chariot.

The government of Karnataka showcased the statue of Lord Gometashwara at the Republic Day Parade of 2005 where it received the first prize from the then President of India Honourable Dr. A. P. J. Abdul Kalam.

On August 5, 2007, the statue at Shravanabelagola was voted by the readers of Times of India as the first of the Seven Wonders of India with 49% votes in favor of the statue.

Archaeological Survey of India has listed the group of monuments in Shravanabelagola as Adarsh Smarak Monument.

Notable people
 Bhattaraka Charukeerthi Swamiji, pontiff of the Shravanabelagola Jain Mutt

See also 
 Channarayapatna
 Kantharajapura
 Shravaneri
 Belur, Karnataka
 Halebidu
 Venur
 Dharmasthala
 Mangaluru
 Karkala
 Jainism in Karnataka
 List of Jain temples
 Jain temples, Halebidu

References

Citations

Soruces 
 Karnataka State Gazetteer 1983

External links 

 
 The Bhattarakas of Shravanabelgola and Mudabidri
  More About Shravanabelgola From Karnataka Tourism Department
 Shravanabelgola Bahubali Mahamasthakabhisheka / Mahamastakabhisheka Mahotsava

Cities and towns in Hassan district
Holy cities
Tourist attractions in Hassan district
Jain temples in Karnataka
Jain rock-cut architecture
Jain pilgrimage sites
10th-century Jain temples